Amiret is an unincorporated community in Lyon County, in the U.S. state of Minnesota.

History
Amiret was originally called Saratoga, after Saratoga, New York, and under the latter name was platted in 1874. The present name, adopted in 1879, is for Amiretta Sykes, the wife of a railroad official.

The town's post office first opened under the name Coburg in 1873. The name of the post office was changed to Amiret in 1878, and remained in operation until 1992.

References

Unincorporated communities in Lyon County, Minnesota
Unincorporated communities in Minnesota